Nauru's country code is +674, and the international call prefix is 00. There are seven other numbers in the system.

Telephone ranges 
In August 2011, Criden Appi, the Director of Telecommunications (Regulatory), said that Nauru advises "only 556xxxx, 557xxxx, 558xxxx are in use for mobiles and there are no landlines in service". In the ranges, X=0-9, and Y=0-9.

Mobile telephone number ranges

Fixed line area codes

Special Numbers

See also 
 Telecommunications in Nauru

References

Nauru
Communications in Nauru